Boudhina Yedes Khiari syndrome is a very rare neurocutaneous genetic disorder which is characterized by short stature, microcephaly, intellectual disabilities, tendency to have seizures, hearing loss and skin lesions. This disorder was first discovered in the summer of 1990 in Paris, France by T Boudhina et al., when three sisters were described as sharing the symptoms mentioned above, these symptoms were also found to have a high prevalence within their family afterwards. The suspected mode of inheritance is autosomal recessive.

References 

Genetic diseases and disorders